Mike Cronk is an American politician from Alaska serving as a member of the Alaska House of Representatives since 2021. A Republican, he represents the 36th State House district, which encompasses most of interior Alaska and Copper River Census Area.

Personal life 
Cronk was present at the Route 91 Harvest festival mass shooting.

References

External links 
 Mike Cronk at Ballotpedia

Living people
Republican Party members of the Alaska House of Representatives
21st-century American politicians
Year of birth missing (living people)